Islam is an Abrahamic monotheistic religion teaching that there is only one God (Allah) and that Muhammad is His last Messenger.

The following outline is provided as an overview of and topical guide to Islam.

Beliefs

Aqidah

Allah
God in Islam
Tawhid, Oneness of God
Repentance in Islam
Islamic views on sin
Shirk, Partnership and Idolatory
Haram
Kufr
Bid‘ah

Sunni / Ibadi / Ahmadiyya
 Five Pillars of Islam
 Shahada 
 Salah 
 Sawm 
 Zakat
 Hajj
 Six articles of belief (Arkan al-Iman)
 Tawhid 
 Prophets 
 Holy books 
 Angels
 Jibril, Holy Spirit
 Predestination
 The Day of Judgment

Shia Twelvers
 Theological principles
 Tawhid
 Adl
 Nubuwwah
 Imamate
 Mi'ad
 Ancillaries of the Faith
 Salah
 Sawm 
 Hajj
 Zakat
 Khums 
 Jihad
 Amr-Bil-Ma'rūf
 Nahi-Anil-Munkar
 Tawalla
 Tabarra

Shia Ismaili
 Seven pillars of Ismailism 
 Walayah 
 Taharah 
 Salah
 Zakat
 Sawm
 Hajj
 Jihad

Prophets 

 Prophets of Islam
 Muhammad in Islam
 Muhammad's first revelation
 Miracles of Muhammad
 Isra and Miraj
 Splitting of the moon
 Salawat
 Mawlid
 Nuh (Noah)
 Ibrahim (Abraham)
 Musa (Moses)
 Isa (Jesus)
 Second Coming of Isa
 People of Ya-Sin
 Stories of The Prophets

Scripture 

 List of Islamic texts
 Islamic holy books 
 Quran 
 Sura
 List of surahs in the Quran
 Meccan surah
 Medinan surah
 Ayat 
 Juz'
 Muqatta'at
 Quran and miracles
 Challenge of the Quran
 Women in the Quran
 Female figures in the Quran
 Biblical and Quranic narratives
 Quranic parables
 Tafsir
 Naskh 
 Quran reading
 Hafiz
 Qira'at
 Tajwid
 Tarteel
 Asbab al-nuzul 
 Tawrat (Torah)
 Zabur (Psalms)
 Injil (Gospel)
 Sunnah
 Hadith 
 Hadith studies
 Hadith terminology
 Hadith collections 
 Sunni – Kutub al-Sittah
 Sahih Bukhari
 Sahih Muslim
 Sunan al-Sughra
 Sunan Abu Dawood
 Jami al-Tirmidhi
 Sunan ibn Majah
 Shia – Al-Kutub Al-Arb'ah
 Kitab al-Kafi
 Man la yahduruhu al-Faqih
 Tahdhib al-Ahkam
 Al-Istibsar
 Ibadi
 Jami Sahih 
 Tartib al-Musnad
 Seerah

Denominational specifics

 Shia beliefs
 Ahl al-Kisa
 Muhammad in Islam
 Ali
 Fatimah
 Hasan ibn Ali
 Husayn ibn Ali
 Imamah
 Mourning of Muharram
 Tawassul
 The Four Companions
 Shia clergy
 Twelver beliefs
 Imamate (Twelver doctrine)
 The Fourteen Infallibles
 Occultation (Islam)
 Irfan
 Ismaili beliefs
 Imamah (Ismaili doctrine)
 Nizari Ismaili beliefs
 Imamate in Nizari doctrine
 Alevi beliefs
 Zahir
 Batin
 Ahmadi beliefs
 Bay'ah
 Prophethood
 Isa

Practice
 Aqidah
 Salah
 Prayer
 Fard
 Fajr prayer
 Zuhr prayer
 Asr prayer
 Maghrib prayer
 Isha prayer
 Jumu'ah
 Eid prayers
 Tahajjud
 Nafl prayer
 Rakat
 Basmala
 Takbir
 Ruku
 Sujud
 Tashahhud
 Taslim
 Mosque
 Mihrab
 Minbar
 Khutbah
 Musalla
 Prayer rug
 Conditions
 Adhan
 Iqama
 Salat times
 Qibla
 Wudu
 Ghusl
 Turbah
 Sawm
 Ramadan
 Suhur
 Iftar
 Tarawih
 Iʿtikāf
 Laylat al-Qadr
 Eid al-Fitr
 Zakat al-Fitr
 Zakat
 Sadaqah
 Hajj
 Ihram
 Miqat
 Tawaf
 Stoning of the Devil
 Eid al-Adha
 Umrah
 Holy Mosques
 Masjid al-Haram
 Kaaba
 Al-Masjid an-Nabawi
 Al-Masjid al-Aqsa
 Jihad
 Dawah

Denominational specifics
 Shia rituals
 Mourning of Muharram
 Day of Ashura
 Imam Husayn Shrine
 Arba'een Pilgrimage
 Ziyarat
 Hussainiya
 Marsiya
 Noha
 Maddahi
 Soaz
 Tasu'a
 Ta'zieh
 Tatbir
 Tabuik
 Hosay
 Chup Tazia
 Rawda Khwani
 Hosseini infancy conference
 Shia days of remembrance
 Ashura 
 Arba'een 
 Mawlid 
 Eid al-Fitr 
 Eid al-Adha 
 Eid al-Ghadeer
 Ahmadiyya view
 Jihad

Schools and branches

 Schools of Islamic theology
 Madhhab
 Divisions of the world in Islam
 Islamic schools and branches a.k.a. The Islamic denomination or Muslim denominations
 Denominational
 Sunni Islam, a.k.a. Ahlus Sunnah wal Jamaah
 Maliki
 Shafii
 Maturidi
 Hanafi
 Ashari
 Hanbali
 Madkhali
 Athari
 Wahhabi
 Salafi
 Shia Islam
 Imami Shia
 Imami Ismailism
 Batiniyyah
 Druze
 Musta'li
 Taiyabi
 Alavi
 Dawoodis
 Progressive Dawoodis
 Sulaymani
 Assassins
 Imami Twelvers
 Alevism
 Ghulat
 Alawites
Qizilbash
 Zaidiyyah ("Fiver")
 Kharjites
 Ibadi
 Sufism – Tariqa – List of Sufi orders
 Bektashi
 Chishti
 Galibi
 Kubrawiya
 Mevlevi
 Mouride
 Naqshbandi
 Ni'matullahi
 Noorbakshia
 Oveysi
 Qadiri
 Qalandariyya
 Rifa'i
 Senussi
 Shadhili
 Suhrawardiyya
 Tijaniyyah
 Schools of Jurisprudence, Branches, Doctrines and Movements
 Sunni
 Hanafi
 Maliki
 Shafi'i
 Hanbali
 Zahiri
 Ahl al-Hadith, (School of 2nd/3rd Islamic centuries)
 Ahl-i Hadith, (Movement in South-Asia in mid-nineteenth English century)
 Salafi movement
 Wahhabism
 Shia
 Ja'fari
 Usuli
 Akhbari
 Ismaili
 Zaidi
 Schools of Islamic theology
 Kalam
 Ash'ari
 Maturidi
 Athari
 Murji'ah
 Karramiyya
 Qadariyyah
 Mu'tazili
 Other branches
 Gülen movement
 Islamism
 Liberal Islam
 Mahdavia
 Nation of Islam
 Non-denominational Muslims
 Quranism
 Conferences, Movements and Organizations on Union and Peace
 Amman Message
 2016 international conference on Sunni Islam in Grozny
 Organisation of Islamic Cooperation
 The World Forum for Proximity of Islamic Schools of Thought
 Islamic Unity week
 Al-Azhar Shia Fatwa
 International Islamic Unity Conference (Iran)
 International Islamic Unity Conference (US)
 Al-Azhar Shia Fatwa
 The World Forum for Proximity of Islamic Schools of Thought
 The Humanitarian Forum
 Islamic Relief
 British Muslim Forum
 Muslim Charities Forum
 Catholic–Muslim Forum
 Muslim Safety Forum
 A Common Word Between Us and You
 Hindu–Muslim unity

Philosophy
 Islamic philosophy
 Early Islamic philosophy
 Kalam
 Avicennism
 Averroism
 Al-aql al-faal
 Islamic ethics
 Morality in Islam
 Logic in Islamic philosophy
 Islamic metaphysics
 Kalam cosmological argument
 Proof of the Truthful
 Sufi philosophy
 Sufi metaphysics
 Sufi cosmology
 Sufi psychology
 Lataif-e-sitta
 Concepts
 Ruh
 Hal
 Manzil
 Maqam
 Fanaa
 Baqaa
 Yaqeen
 Haqiqa
 Marifa
 Ihsan
 Islamic attitudes towards science
 Islamic views on evolution
 Ahmadiyya views on evolution
 Science in the medieval Islamic world
 Alchemy and chemistry in the medieval Islamic world
 Astrology in the medieval Islamic world
 Astronomy in the medieval Islamic world
 Cosmology in medieval Islam
 Geography and cartography in the medieval Islamic world
 Mathematics in the medieval Islamic world
 Medicine in the medieval Islamic world
 Prophetic medicine
 Ophthalmology in the medieval Islamic world
 Physics in the medieval Islamic world
 Psychology in the medieval Islamic world
 Islamic view of miracles
 Contemporary Islamic philosophy

Theology
 Islamic religious sciences
 Islamic theology
 Theological concepts
 Ahl al-Hadith (started in 2nd/3rd Islamic centuries)
 Ahl-i Hadith (another movement in South-Asia in mid-nineteenth English century)
 Ahl ar-Ra'y
 Divisions of the world in Islam
 Fi sabilillah
 Ihsan
 Iman
 Itmam al-hujjah
 Wasat
 Shia theological concepts
 Ismah
 Categorization of individuals
 Mumin
 Muslim
 Faqih
 Fajir
 Kafir
 Munafiq
 Groups
 People of the Book
 Ahl al-Fatrah
 Theological titles
 Caliph
 Shaykh al-Islam
 Sayyid
 Sharif
 Ulama
 Faqih
 Grand Imam of Al-Azhar
 Mufti
 Grand Mufti
 Mujtahid
 Ayatollah
 Marja'
 Imam
 Mullah
 Mujaddid
 Qadi
 Sheikh
 Hajji
 Ansar
 Islamic mythology
 Beings
 Angels
 Iblis
 Jinn
 Ifrit
 Shayṭān
 Div
 Exorcism in Islam, Ruqya
 Places
 Garden of Eden
 Jannah
 Jahannam
 Seven Heavens
 Islamic eschatology
 Mahdi
 Signs of the reappearance of Muhammad al-Mahdi
 Al-Masih ad-Dajjal
 The Occultation
 Barzakh
 Shia eschatology

Law

 Sharia
 Sources of sharia
 Application of sharia law by country
 Fiqh, The Islamic jurisprudence
 Usul al-Fiqh, Principles of Islamic jurisprudence
 Methodology and principles
 Ijazah 
 Ijma 
'Aql 
 Ijtihad 
 Ikhtilaf 
 Istihlal 
 Istihsan 
 Madhhab 
 Madrasah 
 Maqasid
 Maslaha 
 Qiyas 
 Taqlid 
 Urf
 Ahkam
 Batil 
 Bid'ah 
 Fard 
 Fasiq 
 Fitna 
 Gunah 
 Halal 
 Haram 
 Istishhad 
 Jihad 
 Makruh 
 Moharebeh 
 Mubah 
 Mustahabb 
 Taghut 
 Taqiya 
 Thawab
 Topic of fiqh
 Ibadah
 Political
 Islamic leadership
 Bay'ah
 Dhimmi
 Marital
 Marriage in Islam
 Islamic marriage contract
 Mahr
 Nikah Misyar
 Nikah Halala
 Nikah 'urfi
 Nikah mut'ah
 Polygyny in Islam
 Divorce in Islam
 Islamic adoptional jurisprudence
 Sexual
 Islam and masturbation
 Islamic sexual hygienical jurisprudence
 Rape in Islamic law
 Zina
 Intimate parts in Islam
 Criminal
 Hudud
 Islam and blasphemy
 Maisir
 Zina
 Hirabah
 Fasad
 Rajm
 Tazir
 Qisas
 Diya
 Apostasy in Islam
 Beheading in Islam
 Etiquette
 Adab
 Gender segregation
 Harem
 Mahram
 Islamic honorifics
 Islam on female genital mutilation
 Economics
 Zakat
 Jizya
 Nisab
 Khums
 Sadaqah
 Waqf
 Bayt al-mal
 Islamic banking and finance
 Ribat
 Murabaha
 Takaful
 Sukuk
 Islamic inheritance jurisprudence
 Hygiene
 Islamic toilet etiquette
 Taharah
 Wudu
 Masah
 Ghusl
 Tayammum
 Miswak
 Najis
 Dietary
 Dhabihah
 Khamr
 Prohibition of pork 
 Military
 Jihad
 Hudna
 Istijarah
 Prisoners of war in Islam
 Slavery
 Ma malakat aymanukum
 Hisbah
 Islamic religious police

Hadith 
Main article
Hadith
Important Sunni Hadith
Kutub al-Sittah
Sahih al-Bukhari
Sahih Muslim
Al-Sunan al-Sughra
Sunan Abu Dawood
Jami` at-Tirmidhi
Sunan ibn Majah
Important Shia Hadith
The Four Books
Kitab al-Kafi
Man la yahduruhu al-Faqih
Tahdhib al-Ahkam
Al-Istibsar

Hadith Collectors
Muhammad al-Bukhari
Muslim ibn al-Hajjaj
Abu Dawood
Commentary for Sahih al-Bukhari
Fath al-Bari

Related
Hadith studies
Hadith terminology

The supernatural in Islam 
Islamic Concept of God
God in Islam
Names of God in Islam
Allah

The Light before the Material World
Nūr (Islam)
Muhammad in Islam
Al-Insān al-Kāmil
Holy Spirit in Islam

Miracles
Islamic view of miracles
Quran and miracles
Challenge of the Quran
Miracles of Muhammad
Saints

The Angels
Angels in Islam
Alam al Jabarut
Archangel
Artiya'il
Azrael
Cherub
Darda'il
Gabriel
Habib
Harut and Marut
Illiyin
Israfil, Raphael (archangel)
Jannah
Kiraman Katibin
Michael (archangel)
Mu'aqqibat, Hafaza, The Guardian angels
Recording angel
Riḍwan
Seraph

Beings and Forces in ordinary life
Asmodeus
Al-Baqarah
Al-Ikhlas
Al-Mu'awwidhatayn
Al-Falaq
Al-Nas
Adhan
Throne Verse, also known as Al-Baqara 255 and Ayatul Kursi
Evil eye
Hatif
Hinn (mythology)
Ifrit
Jinn
Sura Al-Jinn
Exorcism in Islam
 Ful-filling Fard
 Preventing Major Sins
 Removing Haram objects from body and Home
 Destroying suspicious magical items, Ta'wiz, Talisman, Amulet
 Stop giving information to suspects, Fortune-tellers, Magicians
Marid
Magic (paranormal)
Malakut
Peri
Qalb
Qareen
Solomon in Islam

Death and Human spirit
Barzakh
Illiyin
Islamic view of death
Munkar and Nakir
Nāzi'āt and Nāshiṭāt
Nafs
Rūḥ

Fallen Angels, Devils and Hell
As-Sirāt
Azazel
Dajjal
Div
Falak (Arabian legend)
Fallen angel
Iblis
Jahannam
Maalik
Nar as Samum
Shaitan
Sijjin
Zabaniyya
Zaqqum

Islamic Legends 
Adam in Islam
Akhirah
Al-Safa and Al-Marwah
Azazel
Azrael
Barzakh
Beast of the Earth
Biblical and Quranic narratives
Biblical figures in Islamic tradition
Black Standard
Black Stone
Cain and Abel in Islam
Crescent
Darda'il
Devil (Islam)
Dhul-Qarnayn
Dome of the Rock
Foundation Stone
Gabriel
Gog and Magog
Green in Islam
Hafaza
Hajj
Harut and Marut
Hateem
Holy Spirit (Islam)
Ishmael in Islam
Islamic eschatology
Islamic flags
Islamic view of angels
Islamic view of Jesus' death
Isra and Mi'raj
Israfil
Jahannam
Jannah
Jesus in Ahmadiyya Islam
Jesus in Islam
Kaaba
Khidr
Kiraman Katibin
Kiswah
Maalik
Mahdi
Mary in Islam
Masih ad-Dajjal
Michael (archangel)
Moses in Islam
Mu'aqqibat
Munkar and Nakir
Noah in Islam
Queen of Sheba
Raphael (archangel)
Recording angel
Ridwan (name)
Rub el Hizb
Sarah
Satan
Solomon in Islam
Star and crescent
Symbols of Islam
Tawaf
The Occultation
Well of Souls
Zamzam Well
Zaqqum

History
 History of Islam
 Timeline of Muslim history
 Timeline of Muslim history Year by Year

Timeline of 6th-century Muslim history
Timeline of 7th-century Muslim history
Timeline of 8th-century Muslim history
Timeline of 9th-century Muslim history
Timeline of 10th-century Muslim history
Timeline of 11th-century Muslim history
Timeline of 12th-century Muslim history
Timeline of 13th-century Muslim history
Timeline of 14th-century Muslim history
Timeline of 15th-century Muslim history
Timeline of 16th-century Muslim history
Timeline of 17th-century Muslim history
Timeline of 18th-century Muslim history
Timeline of 19th-century Muslim history
Timeline of 20th-century Muslim history
Timeline of 21st-century Muslim history

 Historiography of early Islam
 List of dynasties of Muslim Rulers
 List of Sunni Muslim dynasties
 List of Shia Muslim dynasties
 Early history
 Muhammad in Mecca
 Persecution of Muslims by Meccans
 Hijrah
 Migration to Abyssinia
 List of expeditions of Muhammad
 Battle of Badr
 Battle of Uhud
 Battle of the Trench
 Battle of Hunayn
 Muhammad in Medina
 Constitution of Medina
 Farewell Pilgrimage
 The event of Ghadir Khumm
 Succession to Muhammad
 Saqifa
 Umar at Fatimah's house
 Caliphate
 Salaf
 Sahaba
 Tabi'un
 Tabi' al-Tabi'in
 Rashidun Caliphate
 Abu Bakr
 Ridda wars
 Umar
 Military conquests of Umar's era
 Reforms of Umar's era (Pact of Umar)
 Uthman
 The election of Uthman
 Siege of Uthman
 Military campaigns under Caliph Uthman
 Muslim conquests
 Early Muslim conquests
 Muslim conquest of Persia
 First Fitna
 Battle of Karbala
 Classical era
 Umayyad Caliphate
 Dinar (Gold dinar) / Dirham / Fals
 Shurta
 Second Fitna
 Umayyad conquest of Hispania
 Timeline of the Muslim presence in the Iberian peninsula
 Caliphate of Cordoba
 Abbasid Caliphate
 Islamic Golden Age
 Muslim Agricultural Revolution
 Mihna
 Shu'ubiyya
 Islamization of Iran
 Muslim conquest of the Indian subcontinent
 Mali Empire
 Bayt al-Hikma
 Zanj Rebellion
 Baghdad Manifesto
 Siege of Baghdad (1258)
 Crusades
 Ghaznavids
 Seljuk Empire
 Ghurid dynasty
 Khwarazmian dynasty
 Fatimid Caliphate
 Ayyubid dynasty
 Ilkhanate
 Mamluk Sultanate
 Sultan
 Almoravid dynasty
 Almohad Caliphate
 Taifa
 Pre-Modern era
 Ottoman Empire
 Islam in the Ottoman Empire
 Millet
 Devshirme
 Ottoman persecution of Alevis
 Slavery in the Ottoman Empire
 Timurid Empire
 Safavids
 Mughal Empire
 Mansabdar
 Al Andalus
 Reconquista
 The spread of Islam in Indonesia (1200 to 1600)
 Wali Sanga
 Modern times
 Partitioning of the Ottoman Empire
 Tanzimat
 Sykes-Picot Agreement
 Saudi Arabia
 Wahhabism
 Destruction of early Islamic heritage sites in Saudi Arabia
 Grand Mosque seizure
 Sokoto Caliphate
 Ahmadiyya Caliphate
 Pakistan movement
 Arab–Israeli conflict / Israeli–Palestinian conflict
 War in Afghanistan (1978–present)
 Iranian Revolution
 Gulf War / Iraq War
 September 11 attacks
 Arab Spring / Arab Winter
 Syrian Civil War
 Iraqi Civil War (2014–2017)
 Libyan Civil War
 Yemeni Civil War (2015–present)

History of Islam by topic

 History of Hajj
 Incidents during the Hajj
 History of the Quran
 Wahy
 Early Quranic manuscripts
 Quranic timeline
 History of Ahmadiyya
 History of Alevism
 History of Nizari Ismailism
 History of Shia Islam

 History of Islam in the medieval Algeria
 History of Islam in China
 History of Islam in the medieval Egypt
 History of Islam in southern Italy
 History of Islam in Yemen
 Reception of Islam in Early Modern Europe

Society

 Ummah
 Islamic calendar
 Islam and humanity
 Islam and children
 Gender roles in Islam
 Women in Islam
 LGBT in Islam
 Mukhannathun
 Islam and clothing
 Animals in Islam
 Muslim holidays
 Qurbani
 Nursing in Islam
 Symbols of Islam
 Islamic education
 Hawza
 Islamic studies
 Madrasa
 List of Islamic seminaries
 List of Muslim educational institutions
 List of oldest madrasahs in continuous operation

Places
 Holiest sites in Islam
 Mecca
 Masjid al-Haram
 Medina
 Al-Masjid an-Nabawi
 Al Quds
 Al-Aqsa Mosque
 Holiest sites in Sunni Islam
 Holiest sites in Shia Islam
 Najaf
 Imam Ali Mosque
 Karbala
 Imam Husayn Shrine
 Al Abbas Mosque
 Mecca
 Al-Baqi'
 Jannat al-Mu'alla
 Damascus
 Sayyidah Zaynab Mosque
 Sayyidah Ruqayya Mosque
 Bab al-Saghir
 Holy sites specific to Twelver Shia Muslims
 Mashhad
 Imam Reza shrine
 Kadhimiya
 Al-Kadhimiya Mosque
 Samarra
 Al-Askari Mosque
 Qom
 Fatima Masumeh Shrine

Culture
 Islamic culture
 Islamic art
 Arabesque
 Girih
 Islamic geometric patterns
 Islamic interlace patterns
 Sitara (textile)
 Zellige
 Islamic architecture
 Architectural elements
 Ablaq
 Iwan
 Mashrabiya
 Minaret
 Muqarnas
 Sahn
 Architectural types
 Kasbah
 Khanqah
 Mosque
 List of largest mosques
 List of the oldest mosques
 Madrasa
 Ribat
 Zawiya
 Islamic calligraphy
 Diwani 
 Kufic 
 Naskh
 Nastaʿlīq
 Islamic garden
 Islamic glass
 Islamic literature
 Islamic advice literature 
 Islamic poetry
Sufi poetry
 Miniatures
 Ottoman miniature
 Mughal miniature
 Persian miniature
 Islamic music
 Nasheed
 Oriental rug
 Islamic pottery

Politics
 Political aspects of Islam
 Shia–Sunni relations
 Islam and modernity
 Islamic Modernism
 Islam and secularism
 Islam Hadhari
 Islam Nusantara
 Islamic democracy
 Cairo Declaration on Human Rights in Islam
 Arab Charter on Human Rights
 Shura
 Turkish model
 Liberalism and progressivism within Islam
 Cultural Muslim
 Enlightened moderation
 Islamic feminism
 Quranism
 Islamic revivalism
 Al-Ahbash
 Barelvi movement
 Deobandi movement
 Gülen movement
 Islamism
 Islamic fundamentalism
 Islamization
 Islamization of knowledge
 Qutbism
 Jihadism
 Salafi movement
 Madkhalism
 Sahwa movement
 Salafi jihadism
 Mujahideen
 Shahid
 Wahhabism
 Post-Islamism
 Pan-Islamism
 Islamic state
 Islamic republic
 Islamic monarchy
 Islamic socialism
 Persecution of Muslims
 Persecution of minority Muslim groups
 Islamophobia
 Islamophobic incidents

Muslim world

 Muslim world
 Islam by country
 List of Muslim-majority countries
 List of countries by Muslim population
 Islamic organizations
 International organization
 Organisation of Islamic Cooperation
 International Association of Islamic Banks
 Islamic Educational, Scientific and Cultural Organization
 Statistical, Economic and Social Research and Training Centre for Islamic Countries
 Islamic Military Alliance
 Islamic political parties
 Islamic democratic
 National Islamic Movement of Afghanistan (Afghanistan)
 Islamic Renaissance Movement (Algeria)
 Al-Menbar Islamic Society (Bahrain)
 Bangladesh Islami Front (Bangladesh)
 Islami Oikya Jote (Bangladesh)
 Party of Democratic Action (Bosnia and Herzegovina)
 Al-Wasat Party (Egypt)
 National Awakening Party (Indonesia)
 National Mandate Party (Indonesia)
 United Development Party (Indonesia)
 All India Majlis-e-Ittehadul Muslimeen (India)
 Indian Union Muslim League (India)
 Islamic Action Organisation (Iraq)
 Islamic Dawa Party (Iraq)
 Islamic Fayli Grouping in Iraq (Iraq)
 Kurdistan Islamic Group (Iraq)
 Islamic Labour Movement in Iraq (Iraq)
 Islamic Union of Iraqi Turkoman (Iraq)
 Islamic Centrist Party (Jordan)
 National Patriotic Party (Kazakhstan)
 United Malays National Organisation (Malaysia)
 Jamaat-e-Islami Pakistan (Pakistan)
 Pakistan Tehreek-e-Insaf (Pakistan)
 Lakas–CMD (Philippines)
 Moro Islamic Liberation Front (Philippines)
 United Bangsamoro Justice Party (Philippines)
 Ideal Democratic Party (Rwanda)
 Sri Lanka Muslim Congress (Sri Lanka)
 Ennahda Movement (Tunisia)
 Islamic liberal
 Islamic Iran Participation Front (Iran)
 National Forces Alliance (Libya)
 Sunni Islamist
 Islamic Dawah Organisation of Afghanistan (Afghanistan)
 Hezbi Islami (Afghanistan)
 Jamiat-e Islami (Afghanistan)
 Green Algeria Alliance (Algeria)
 Movement of Society for Peace (Algeria)
 Movement for National Reform (Algeria)
 Bangladesh Jamaat-e-Islami (Bangladesh)
 Islamic Front Bangladesh (Bangladesh)
 Committee for National Revolution (East Turkestan)
 Freedom and Justice Party (Egypt)
 Building and Development Party (Egypt)
 Islamic Party (Egypt) 
 Prosperous Justice Party (Indonesia)
 Crescent Star Party (Indonesia)
 Reform Star Party (Indonesia)
 Iraqi Islamic Party (Iraq)
 Kurdistan Islamic Union (Iraq)
 Zamzam (party) (Jordan)
 Islamic Action Front (Jordan)
 Hadas (Kuwait)
 Al-Jama'a al-Islamiyya (Lebanon)
 Justice and Construction Party (Libya)
 Homeland Party (Libya)
 Malaysian Islamic Party (PAS) (Malaysia)
 Islamic Democratic Party (Maldives)
 Justice and Development Party (Morocco)
 Jamiat Ahle Hadith (Pakistan)
 Jamiat Ulema-e Islam (F) (Pakistan)
 Hamas (Palestine)
 National Congress (Sudan)
 Muslim Brotherhood of Syria (Syria)
 Islamic Renaissance Party of Tajikistan (Tajikistan)
 Felicity Party (Turkey)
 Shia Islamist
 Islamic Movement of Afghanistan (Afghanistan)
 Hizb-i-Wahdat (Afghanistan)
 Islamic Party of Azerbaijan (Azerbaijan)
 Al Wefaq (Bahrain)
 Bahrain Freedom Movement (Bahrain)
 Islamic Action Society (Bahrain)
 Hezbollah (Lebanon)
 Alliance of Builders of Islamic Iran (Iran)
 Islamic Coalition Party (Iran)
 National Iraqi Alliance (Iraq)
 Islamic Dawa Party – Iraq Organisation (Iraq)
 Islamic Supreme Council of Iraq (Iraq)
 Islamic Virtue Party (Iraq)
 Tehrik-e-Jafaria (Pakistan)
 Salafist
 Al Asalah (Bahrain)
 Young Kashgar Party (East Turkestan)
 Al-Nour Party (Egypt)
 Adhaalath Party (Maldives)
 Muttahida Majlis-e-Amal (Pakistan)
 Al-Islah (Yemen)
 Militant organization
 Sunni Jihadism
 Abu Sayyaf
 al-Itihaad al-Islamiya
 Al-Qaeda
 Al-Shabaab 
 Ansar al-Islam
 Ansar al-Sharia
 Boko Haram
 Darul Islam
 Gerakan Mujahidin Islam Patani
 Hizbul Islam
 Indonesian Mujahedeen Council
 Islamic State of Iraq and the Levant
 Laskar Jihad
 Taliban
 Shia Jihadism
 Hezbollah
 Non-governmental organization
 Muslim Brotherhood (Egypt)
 Muhammadiyah (Indonesia)
 Nahdlatul Ulama (Indonesia)
 Indonesian Ulema Council (Indonesia)
 PERSIS (organization) (Indonesia)
 Islamic Defenders Front (Indonesia)
 Tamil Nadu Muslim Munnetra Kazagham (India)
 Popular Front of India (India)
 Dawat-e-Islami (Pakistan)
 Society of the Revival of Islamic Heritage
 Islamic Information Center
 Muslim World League
 Islamic relief organizations
 International Islamic Relief Organization
 Islamic Relief
 Islamic Relief USA
 Muslim Aid
 IHH Humanitarian Relief Foundation
 Imam Khomeini Relief Foundation
 International Islamic Council for Da'wah and Relief
 Solidarity Youth Movement
 The Zakat Foundation

People

Key religious figures
 Prophets and messengers in Islam

Muhammad

 Muhammad's wives

Sahabah
 Sahabah
 List of Sahabah
 List of non-Arab Sahabah
Ashara e mubashra
Hadith of the ten promised paradise
Abu Bakr
Umar
Uthman ibn Affan
Ali
Talhah
Az-Zubair
Abdur Rahman bin Awf
Sa'd bin Abi Waqqas
Abu Ubaidah ibn al-Jarrah
Sa'id ibn Zayd
Most hadith narrating sahabah
Abu Hurairah
Abdullah Ibn Umar
Anas ibn Malik
Aisha
Abd Allah ibn Abbas
Jabir ibn Abd Allah
Abu Sa‘id al-Khudri
Abdullah ibn Masud
'Abd Allah ibn 'Amr ibn al-'As

Umar
 Family tree of Umar
 Umm Kulthum bint Ali (Wife)
 Abdullah ibn Umar (son)
 Hafsa bint Umar (Daughter)
 Asim ibn Umar (son)
 Sunni view of Umar
 Shi'a view of Umar
 Ten Promised Paradise

Uthman
 Family tree of Uthman
 Uthman Quran

Denominational specifics

Sunni Islam
 List of Sunni Islamic scholars by schools of jurisprudence

Deobandi
 List of Deobandis
 List of students of Mahmud Hasan Deobandi
 List of Darul Uloom Deoband alumni
 Ashraf Ali Thanwi
 Hussain Ahmed Madani

Barelvi
 Ahmed Raza Khan Barelvi

Shia Islam
 The Four Companions
 Abū Dhar al-Ghifāri
 Ammār ibn Yāsir
 Miqdad ibn Aswād al-Kindi
 Salman the Persian
 Holy women of Shia Islam
 Fatimah
 Khadija bint Khuwaylid
 Umm Salama
 Zaynab bint Ali
 Umm Kulthum bint Ali
 Umm ul-Banin
 Fatimah bint Hasan
 Sukayna bint Husayn
 Rubab
 Shahrbanu
 Fātimah bint Mūsā
 Hakimah Khātūn
 Narjis
 Fatimah bint Asad
 Umm Farwah bint al-Qasim
 Companions of Ali ibn Abi Talib

 Companions of Ali ibn Husayn Zayn al-Abidin

 List of Shia Imams

 List of current Maraji
 List of deceased Maraji

Imami Twelver

 The Fourteen Infallibles
 Muhammad in Islam
 Fātimah
 Ali
 Hasan ibn Ali
 Husayn ibn Ali
 Ali ibn Husayn Zayn al-Abidin
 Muhammad al-Baqir
 Ja'far al-Sadiq
 Mūsā al-Kādhim
 Alī ar-Ridhā
 Muhammad al-Jawad
 Ali al-Hadi
 Hasan al-'Askarī
 Muhammad al-Mahdi

Imami Ismailism
 List of Ismaili imams

Alevism
Key figures

 Khadija bint Khuwaylid 
 Fatimah 
 Khidr 
 Salman the Persian 
 Uwais al-Qarani
 Jābir ibn Hayyān 
 Dhul-Nun al-Misri 
 Bayazid Bastami
 Ibn al-Rawandi
 Mansur Al-Hallaj
 Nasir Khusraw
 Abu al-Hassan al-Kharaqani
 Yusuf Hamdani 
 Khoja Akhmet Yassawi 
 Abdul-Qadir Gilani 
 Ahmed ar-Rifa'i 
 Ibn Arabi 
 Qutb ad-Dīn Haydar 
 Ahi Evren 
 Haji Bektash Veli 
 Rumi 
 Sadr al-Din al-Qunawi
 Zahed Gilani
 Sari Saltik

 Yunus Emre 
 Safi-ad-din Ardabili
 Nāimī 
 Sadr al-Dīn Mūsā 
 Imadaddin Nasimi
 Shah Nimatullah Wali 
 Shaykh Junayd 
 Shaykh Haydar 
 Ali Mirza Safavi 
 Ismail I
 Nur-Ali Khalifa
 Kaygusuz Abdal
 Otman Baba
 Balım Sultan 
 Gül Baba 
 Fuzûlî
 Alians 
 Demir Baba Teke
 Arabati Baba Teḱe
 Pir Sultan Abdal 
 Kul Nesîmî
 Sheikh Bedreddin
 Börklüce Mustafa
 Torlak Kemal

Islamism
Key ideologues

 Abul Hasan Ali Nadwi
 Mahmud Hasan Deobandi
 Ashraf Ali Thanwi
 Hussain Ahmed Madani
 Shah Ahmad Shafi
 Sayyid Qutb
 Abul A'la Maududi
 Yusuf al-Qaradawi
 Taqi al-Din al-Nabhani
 Muhammad Asad
 Hassan al-Banna
 Ata Abu Rashta
 Haji Shariatullah
 Jamāl al-Dīn al-Afghānī 
 Muhammad Abduh
 Rashid Rida
 Muhammad Iqbal

 Muhammad Nasiruddin al-Albani
 Hassan Al-Turabi
 Mahathir Mohamad
 Ahmed Yassin 
 Ali Shariati 
 Navvab Safavi
 Ali Khamenei 
 Ruhollah Khomeini
 Qazi Hussain Ahmad
 Rached Ghannouchi
 Necmettin Erbakan
 Safwat Hegazi

Modernist Salafism
 Muhammad Abduh
 Rashid Rida

Salafi movement
 List of Salafi scholars
 Abd al-Aziz ibn Baz
 Muhammad ibn al Uthaymeen
 Muhammad Nasiruddin al-Albani
 Muqbil bin Hadi al-Wadi'i
 Sayyid Qutb
 Umar Sulaiman Al-Ashqar

Sufism
 List of contemporary Sufi scholars
 List of modern Sufi scholars
 List of Sufi saints

List of Muslims by topic

Historical

 List of Caliphs

 List of honored women in Islam

 List of Ayyubid sultans and emirs

 List of Mamluk sultans

 List of Ghaznavid sultans

 Grand Viziers of the Safavid Empire

 Viziers of the Samanid Empire

 List of Sheikh-ul-Islams of the Ottoman Empire
 Grand Viziers of Ottoman Empire

Denominational / religious-related occupational

 List of Ahmadis
 List of Alawites
 List of converts to Islam
 List of Da'is
 List of Hanafis
 Maliki fiqh scholars
 List of Ash'aris and Maturidis
 List of Islamic jurists

 List of Mahdi claimants
 List of Muslim theologians
 List of Shi'a Muslims
 List of Shia Muslim scholars of Islam
 List of Sufis
 List of Sufi singers

Professional

 List of Islamic studies scholars
 List of modern-day Muslim scholars of Islam
 List of Muslim Christianity scholars
 List of Muslim comparative religionists
 List of Muslim feminists
 List of Muslim historians
 List of Muslim Nobel Laureates
 List of Muslim painters
 List of Muslim philosophers
 List of Muslim Rajputs

 List of Muslim scientists
 List of Muslim astronauts
 List of Muslim astronomers
 List of Muslim geographers
 List of Muslim mathematicians
 List of Muslim soldiers
 List of Muslim writers and poets
 List of Muslims in entertainment and the media

Regional

 Islamic rulers in the Indian subcontinent
 List of American Muslims
 List of British Muslims
 List of Burmese Muslims
 List of Chinese Muslims
 List of Canadian Muslims

 List of German Muslims
 List of Indian Muslims
 List of notable Hyderabadi Muslims
 List of Israeli Arab Muslims

See also

References

External links 

 Alislam
 Islamic Life 
 Al-islam

Islam
Islam-related lists
Outlines of religions
Wikipedia outlines